Mongo may refer to:
Martyn Barkey

Geography

Africa 
 Mongo, Chad, a Sahel city
 Apostolic Vicariate of Mongo (Roman Catholic missionary jurisdiction)
 Mongo, Sierra Leone, a chiefdom
 Mongo River (Little Scarces River), Guinea and Sierra Leone, a tributary of the Little Scarces River; see List of rivers of Guinea and List of rivers of Sierra Leone
 Mongo Department, Gabon

United States 
 Mongo, Indiana, United States, an unincorporated community

Languages
 Mongo language, the language of the Mongo people
 Mongo, one of the five languages of the Duala language-cluster, spoken in Cameroon

People
 Mongo people, one of the largest ethnic groups in the Democratic Republic of the Congo
 Mongo Santamaría (1917–2003), Cuban jazz/salsa percussionist
 Mongo Beti (1932–2001), pen name of Cameroonian writer Alexandre Biyidi Awala
 "Mongo", family nickname for Ramón Castro Ruz (1924–2016), eldest brother of Fidel Castro
 Mongo, nickname of musician Drew Parsons (born 1974)
 Mongo, a London-based rapper and founder of hip hop group Mud Family
 Mark LoMonaco (born 1971), American professional wrestler, one of whose ring names is "Mongo Vyle"
 Mike Mangold (1955–2015), American airline and former aerobatics pilot whose US Air Force call sign was "Mongo"
 Steve McMichael (born 1957), former American football player and professional wrestler whose ring name was "Mongo"

Fiction
 Mongo (fictional planet), a fictional setting for the adventures of Flash Gordon
 Magic Mongo, a fictional genie featured in segments of the Saturday morning TV program The Krofft Supershow
 Mongo (Shrek), a fictional giant gingerbread man in the animated movie Shrek 2
 Mongo the Magnificent, a fictional private investigator with dwarfism
 Mongo, a character in the film Precious
 Mongo, a character in the 1974 comedy film Blazing Saddles, played by Alex Karras
 General Mongo, a character in the 1970 Western film Compañeros
 Mongo, a fictional boss character in the game show Nick Arcade

Other uses
 Möngö, a Mongolian monetary unit worth 0.01 Mongolian tögrög
 Mongo (album), a 1959 album by Mongo Santamaría
 Mongo (horse), an American champion thoroughbred racehorse
 MongoDB, a document-oriented database
 Mongo foot, the use of the front foot to propel a skateboard
 Buddleja davidii 'Mongo' = Nanho Blue, a shrub cultivar

See also
 Monga (disambiguation)
 Mongol (disambiguation)
 Mungo (disambiguation)

Language and nationality disambiguation pages